The ambassador of the United Kingdom to the Republic of Nicaragua is the United Kingdom's foremost diplomatic representative in Nicaragua, and in charge of the UK's diplomatic mission in Managua.

Until 1945, UK envoys to Guatemala were also accredited to Nicaragua (see List of ambassadors of the United Kingdom to Guatemala), but there were occasionally consular representatives in the country. From 1976 to 1991 and 2004 to 2011 the ambassador to Costa Rica was also accredited to Nicaragua. From 2011 to 2015 the UK had a separate ambassador to Nicaragua, although he was resident in Costa Rica (he was married to the ambassador to Costa Rica). From 2015 the ambassador to Costa Rica is again also accredited to Nicaragua.

List of heads of mission

Consular representatives before 1945
1876- : Alexander Gollan

Envoy Extraordinary and Minister Plenipotentiary
1945–1948: Archibald Robertson 
1948–1952: Nigel Steward
1952–1953: Hubert Evans

Ambassador Extraordinary and Plenipotentiary
1953–1954: Hubert Evans
1954–1959: Horace Gates
1959–1961: William Massey 
1961–1963: Patrick Johnston 
1963–1967: Roger Pinsent 
1967–1970: George Warr
1970–1973: Ivor Vincent
1974–1976: David Duncan
1976–1979: Keith Hamylton Jones (non-resident) 
1979–1982: Michael Brown (non-resident) 
1982–1986: Peter Summerscale (non-resident) 
1986–1989: Michael Daly (non-resident) 
1989–1991: William Marsden (non-resident) 
1991–1992: Roger Brown 
1992–1997: John Culver 
1997–2000: Roy Osborne
2000–2002: Harry Wiles
2002–2004: Tim Brownbill 
2004–2006: Georgina Butler (non-resident) 
2006–2011: Thomas Kennedy (non-resident) 
2011–2015: Chris Campbell (non-resident) 

2015–: Ross Denny (non-resident)

External links
UK and Nicaragua, gov.uk

References

Nicaragua
 
United Kingdom Ambassadors